Belper Lane End is a village in the civil parish of Belper, in the Amber Valley district, in the county of Derbyshire, England.

History 
There is evidence within and near the village of mining. The Bull's Head Inn sits in a prominent position on the junction of Belper Lane and Dalley Lane. It is an old coaching inn mentioned as a stopping place for coaches travelling on the turnpiked, tolled Wirksworth to London Road in 1794.
Historical maps show the position of a Wesleyan Chapel, now demolished, on Belper Lane.

St Faith's 

Further south on Dalley Lane is the small church dedicated to St Faith. The church was built in 1890 for the religious education of local children  and use by the local community by the Sisters of the Convent of St. Lawrence of Belper together with the then vicar of  Belper's Christ Church. The church fell into a state of disrepair and was closed for use in 2005 to the great regret of local residents. Local residents formed the “Friends of St Faith's” group and fought to bring attention to their cause, even holding a Harvest Festival in field opposite the church. The property came to the attention of Caroline Foster who was able to buy the church, and attached cottages. The church was registered as a place of public worship until its sale in April 2014, when Caroline surrendered her interest in St Faiths.

References 

Villages in Derbyshire
Geography of Amber Valley
Belper